Watervalsrivier Pass, (English: Waterfalls River), is a mountain pass, situated in the Mpumalanga  province of South Africa, on the Regional road R37 between Lydenburg and Burgersfort.

Mountain passes of Mpumalanga